Indah Putri Indriani is an Indonesian politician and the current regent of North Luwu Regency. She was also the deputy regent of North Luwu from 2010 to 2015.

During her tenure as deputy regent, Vice Governor Agus Arifin Nu'mang presented Indriani with the Fajar Institute of Pro Otonomi Award for excellence in public participation following her innovations using the USAID-supported Kinerja program. Her work with the program has continued into her tenure as regent due to her devotion to the issue of education equality as well as her efforts to make regency budgeting data publicly available to all citizens. Her interest in educational policy began when she attempted to transfer a teacher between regional schools, leading the woman to threaten her at gunpoint; Indriani claims the confrontation made her realize that people affected by decisions must be involved in making them.

Prior to politics, Indriani was active in academia. She graduated in political science at Universitas Indonesia and lectured there for a time, as well as at Bung Karno University and the university of Muhammadiyah in Jakarta.

References

1977 births
Indonesian Sunni Muslims
Living people
Politicians from South Sulawesi
Mayors and regents of places in South Sulawesi
Women regents of places in Indonesia
University of Indonesia alumni
Great Indonesia Movement Party politicians
Regents of places in Indonesia